Kosów may refer to:
Polish name for Kosiv in Ukraine
Kosów, Łódź Voivodeship (central Poland)
Kosów, Piaseczno County in Masovian Voivodeship (east-central Poland)
Kosów Lacki, a town in  Masovian Voivodeship, Poland (east-central Poland)